John Scott (20 June 1821 – 2 July 1898) was a grazier, company director and politician in colonial Queensland.

Scott was born in Edinburgh, Scotland, the son of John Scott and his wife Marion Purves. John Scott junior's wife was Agnes Thomson who died in July 1892.

Business life
Scott was educated at St Andrew's University  and Edinburgh University, where he studied medicine. He arrived in New South Wales in 1843. For a time he was a squatter in Goulburn, New South Wales. Between 1851 and 1852 he was in the United Kingdom. He went to Queensland in 1855. He stocked Palm-Tree Creek, Dawson which he sold in 1865 but acquired  further stations. Scott was a director of City Mutual Life Assurance Society and vice president of The Royal National Agricultural and Industrial Association of Queensland. Scott was a trustee of Brisbane Grammar School from 1874 to 1888 and Honorary Treasurer from 1877 to 1886.

Political career
Scott was both a member of the Legislative Assembly of Queensland and the Queensland Legislative Council in a political career lasting from 1868 till 1890.

He was Chairman of Committees of the Legislative Assembly, 15 November 1871 to 1 September 1873 and 21 January 1879 to 26 July 1883.

Scott died at Lucerne, Milton, Brisbane, Queensland in 1898 and was buried in Toowong Cemetery.

Family
John Scott and his wife Agnes had five children:
Ada Frances (1855–1905), the wife of George Neville Griffiths M.L.A. Griffiths and Ada Frances were the grandparents of William Charles Wentworth M.P. (1907-2003)
 Arthur (1857–1874)
 Dr. Eric Scott (b. 1859)
 Florence (b. 1860)
 Constance

See also
 Political families of Australia: Wentworth/Hill/Griffiths/Scott/Cooper family

References

 Waterson, Duncan Bruce: Biographical Register of the Queensland Parliament 1860-1929 (second edition), Sydney 2001.
 Queenslander, 9 July 1898
 Alphabetical Register of Members (Queensland Parliament)

1821 births
1898 deaths
Australian people of Scottish descent
Alumni of the University of St Andrews
Alumni of the University of Edinburgh
Members of the Queensland Legislative Assembly
Members of the Queensland Legislative Council
Burials at Toowong Cemetery
19th-century Australian politicians